Problepsis metallopictata is a moth of the  family Geometridae. It is found on Ambon Island.

References

Moths described in 1888
Scopulini
Moths of Indonesia